Anna M. Sargsyan (born 10 April 2001) is an Armenian chess player. She received the FIDE title of International Master (IM) in 2021 and is a European Women's Team Chess Championship individual gold medal winner (2019).

Biography
Sargsyan participated in European Youth Chess Championships and World Youth Chess Championships and reached best result in 2017, when she ranked 4th in European Youth Chess Championship in girl's U16 age group. Since 2016 she participated in Armenian Women's Chess Championship finals where her best result is 4th place in 2016.

She played for Armenia in the Women's Chess Olympiad:
 In 2018, at third board in the 43rd Chess Olympiad (women) in Batumi (+5, =4, -2).

Sargsyan played for Armenia in the World Women's Team Chess Championship:
 In 2019, at third board in the 7th Women's World Team Chess Championship in Astana (+2, =3, -4).

She played for Armenia in the European Women's Team Chess Championship:
 In 2019, at reserve board in the 22nd European Team Chess Championship (women) in Batumi (+6, =2, -0) and won individual gold medal.

In 2019, Sargsyan was awarded the FIDE Woman International Master (WIM) title.

References

External links
 
 
 

2001 births
Living people
Armenian female chess players
Chess Woman International Masters
Chess Olympiad competitors